The American Chemical Society Award in Pure Chemistry is awarded annually by the American Chemical Society (ACS) "to recognize and encourage fundamental research in pure chemistry carried out in North America by young men and women."  "Young" means born within 35 years of the awarding of the Award, which takes place at the Spring meeting of the ACS.  To be eligible, a nominee "must have accomplished research of unusual merit for an individual on the threshold of her or his career. Special consideration is given to independence of thought and originality in the research...."  The award was first awarded in 1931, with Linus Pauling the inaugural recipient.  It is sponsored by the Alpha Chi Sigma Fraternity and the Alpha Chi Sigma Educational Foundation.

List of recipients
Source: American Chemical Society

See also

 List of chemistry awards

References

External links
American Chemical Society Pure Chemistry Award Page

Awards of the American Chemical Society
Awards established in 1931